Graham Charles Williams (26 January 1945 – 25 January 2018) was a New Zealand rugby union player. A flanker, Williams represented  at a provincial level, and was a member of the New Zealand national side, the All Blacks in 1967 and 1968. He played 18 matches for the All Blacks, including five internationals.

Williams died in Wellington on 25 January 2018, having suffered from frontal lobe dementia and motor neurone disease.

References

1945 births
2018 deaths
Rugby union players from Wellington City
People educated at Rongotai College
New Zealand rugby union players
New Zealand international rugby union players
Wellington rugby union players
Rugby union flankers